Ethan Fisher (born 29 January 2001) is a South African rugby union player for the  in the Currie Cup. His regular position is centre.

Fisher was named in the  side for the 2022 Currie Cup Premier Division.

References

South African rugby union players
Living people
Rugby union centres
Sharks (Currie Cup) players
2001 births
Rugby union players from Johannesburg
Pumas (Currie Cup) players